Sethia or Setia is an Indian surname. Notable people with the surname include:

Babulal Sethia (born 1951), British-Indian cardiac surgeon
Kanhaiyalal Sethia (1919–2008), Indian poet
Shirley Setia, Indian-born singer and actress

See also
Sethi
Seth (surname)
Sheth

Indian surnames
Surnames of Indian origin
Surnames of Hindustani origin
Hindu surnames